is a Japanese shōjo manga artist. Her debut was in 1987 with the story Namida no Message, published in the Autumn issue of Ribon Original. She has since published her manga in Ribon and its spin-off magazines.

Notable works by her are Baby Love and Penguin Brothers. The former was adapted into an OVA, screened at a Ribon event and its video later given away as part of Ribon's mail order service.

Works
 (1990, serialized in Ribon, Shueisha)
 (1990, serialized in Ribon, Shueisha)
 (1992–1993, Shueisha)
  (1994–1995, Shueisha) (2008, reprint Shueisha)
  (1996–1999, serialized in Ribon, Shueisha) (2007, reprint Shueisha)
  (2000–2002, serialized in Ribon, Shueisha)
  (2001, Shueisha)
  (2003, serialized in Ribon, Shueisha)
 (2006, Shueisha)

References

External links 
 

Manga artists from Ehime Prefecture
Living people
1969 births
Female comics writers